Dubé and Dube may refer to:

 Dubé (surname)
 Dubé, Ethiopia, the major town in Doba
 Dube, South Africa, a suburb of Soweto
 Dube Jillo (born 1970), Ethiopian long-distance runner
 The Dube, a percussion instrument invented by Dion Dublin, English TV presenter and former footballer

See also
 Georges Duby (1919-1996), a French historian of the Middle Ages
 Dwivedi, the Indian variant of Dubé